Events from the year 1928 in Sweden

Incumbents
 Monarch – Gustaf V
 Prime Minister – Carl Gustaf Ekman, Arvid Lindman

Events

Literature 
 Anna Svärd, novel by Selma Lagerlöf

Sport 
 24–29 January – The World Table Tennis Championships were held in Stockholm

Births

 24 March – Ivar Aronsson, Swedish rower (died 2017)
 2 June – Stig Claesson, writer (died 2008)
 29 June – Hans Cavalli-Björkman, lawyer
 15 July – Stig Andersson-Tvilling, footballer and ice hockey player (died 1989).
 15 July – Hans Andersson-Tvilling, footballer and ice hockey player.
 18 July – Stig Grybe, actor, comedian, writer and film director (died 2017)
 12 December – Ernst-Hugo Järegård, Swedish actor (d. 1998)
 21 December – Stig Sjölin, boxer (died 1995).

Deaths
 6 February - Amanda Christensen, seamstress and business person  (born 1863)
 21 June –  Carl Axel Magnus Lindman, botanist (born 1856)
 20 August – Lisa Steier, ballerina and ballet master (born 1888)
 13 September – Olena Falkman, concert vocalist (born 1849)
 27 November – Gunhild Rosén, ballerina and ballet master (born 1855)
 16 December – Ebba De la Gardie, reporter (born 1867)

References

 
Sweden
Years of the 20th century in Sweden